Rottenknechte is a 1971 East German five-part television film directed by Frank Beyer. The first part premiered on 8 January 1971 on the East German public channel DFF1, with the other four parts being shown in the same month. The film concentrates on the last days of the German navy during World War II. The title derives from the nickname of the junior of two commanding officers in a pair (Rotte) of submarines. The leader is the Rottenführer ("pair leader"), and his subordinate is the Rottenknecht ("pair servant").

References

External links
 

1971 films
1971 German television series debuts
1971 German television series endings
East German films
Television in East Germany
1970s German television miniseries
Films directed by Frank Beyer
Films set in the Baltic Sea
1970s German-language films
German-language television shows
World War II naval films
World War II television drama series
German television films